Meenakshi (1700-1736) was the queen regent of the Madurai Nayak Kingdom between 1731 and 1736.  She ruled as regent for her adopted son.

She was the granddaughter-in-law of Rani Mangammal. She married king Vijaya Ranga Chokkanatha Nayak of the Madurai Nayak Kingdom. In 1731, her spouse died without heirs. She adopted the son of Vangaru Thirumalai, had the minor boy declared heir, and proclaimed herself as regent of the kingdom in his name. 

She was the last ruler in the Madurai Nayaks line.

See also
 Polygar War

References

Indian queens
1736 deaths
Telugu people
Regents of India
Madurai Nayak dynasty
1700 births
18th-century women rulers
18th-century Indian women
18th-century Indian people